An eyre or iter, sometimes called a general eyre, was the name of a circuit travelled by an itinerant justice in medieval England (a justice in eyre), or the circuit court over which they presided, or the right of the monarch (or justices acting in their name) to visit and inspect the holdings of any vassal. The eyre involved visits and inspections at irregular intervals of the houses of vassals in the kingdom. The term is derived from Old French erre, from Latin iter ("journey"), and is cognate with errand and errant. Eyres were also held in those parts of Ireland under secure English rule from about 1220 onwards, but the eyre system seems to have largely gone into abeyance in Ireland at the end of the thirteenth century, and the last Irish eyre was held in 1322.

Eyre of 1194
The eyre of 1194 was initiated under Hubert Walter's justiciarship to restore royal justice following the anarchy of Prince John's rebellion. Within two months, justices on eyre had visited every shire in England. The Articles of Eyre appointed local knights as coroners to record crown pleas to be presented to the justices. The motivation for this administrative reform was the need to raise money for King Richard I's reconquest of Normandy. The coroners were also required to account for the wealth forfeited by the rebels and list the financial resources of each shire.

Eyre of 1233
One medieval chronicle asserts that the 1233 Eyre of Cornwall provoked terror in the populace, with men having "fled into the woods" in fear of the judges.

Itinerant justices
1170 Gervase de Cornhill; John Cumin
1177 Robert Marmion
1190 Simon of Pattishall
1208 Richard of Staines
1209 Gerard de Camville
1217 Thomas de Multon
1218 Walter of Pattishall
1221 Thomas De Heydon
1224-5 John de Bayeux
1225 John de Baalun
1225 Martin of Pattishall
1225 Richard de Veym
1225 Peter, abbot of Tewkesbury
1226 Alambire Lucas

References

Further reading
William Craddock Bolland. The General Eyre. Cambridge University Press. 1922. Internet Archive:  . First paperback edition. 2015. Google Books
David Crook. Records of the General Eyre. HMSO. 1982. Google Books
Kenneth F. Duggan, "The Limits of Strong Government: Attempts to Control Criminality in Thirteenth-Century England", Historical Research 93:261 (2020), pp. 399–419
Reginald Francis Treharne. "Appendix C2: Note on the Frequency of the General Eyre". The Baronial Plan of Reform, 1258–1263. 1932. Manchester University Press. Barnes and Noble, New York. Reprinted with additions. 1971. Page 398.
 Blomefield, Francis, (1807) An Essay towards a Topographical History of the County of Norfolk: volume 6, p. 244.

English legal terminology
Medieval English law